Stockton is a neighborhood and former municipality in Camden, New Jersey, United States. It has a population of 6,479.

Stockton was incorporated as a township by an act of the New Jersey Legislature on February 23, 1859, from portions of Delaware Township (now Cherry Hill). Portions of the township were taken to form Merchantville on March 3, 1874, and Pennsauken Township on February 18, 1892. Based on the results of a referendum that passed on March 22, 1894, Stockton was reincorporated as a town as of May 1, 1894. On March 24, 1899, Stockton was annexed by the City of Camden.

References

1858 establishments in New Jersey
1899 disestablishments in New Jersey
Former townships in New Jersey
Former towns in New Jersey
Neighborhoods in Camden, New Jersey